is a sexologist, educator, author, artist, speaker, and coach. Midori wrote the first English language book with instruction on Japanese rope bondage and continues to write on alternative sexual practices, including BDSM and sexual fetishism, bondage, erotic fiction, and more. She teaches classes, presents at conferences, coaches individuals and professionals, and facilitates in-depth weekend intensives. She is based in San Francisco, California.

Biography 
Midori was born in Kyoto, Japan, of Japanese and German parents. She grew up in Tokyo and moved to the United States at age 14. Midori studied psychology at University of California, Berkeley. She served as a United States Army Reserve Intelligence officer while earning a degree.

Career 
Early in her career she also worked as a condom manufacturer's sales representative. She spent a few years as a sex educator with San Francisco Sex Information. After serving in the military, she began her art career performing in queer nightclubs, collaborating with other "weirdo" transgressive and experimental artists.

Midori teaches internationally on BDSM, alternative sexuality, feminine dominance, Shibari / Japanese bondage, and kink. She has spoken at conferences, universities, and organizations promoting sexual health, wellness, and education.

In 2021, she worked with the Sexual Health Alliance to create the year-long Kink Informed Certification (KIC) Program which offers training to therapists, educators, coaches, or consultants who works with individuals engaging in kink, BDSM, and alternative sexuality.

She is known for her in-depth weekend intensives, ForteFemme: Women's Dominance Intensive and Rope Dojo: Rope Bondage Weekend Intensive where she uses her "head-heart-hands" method to create a space where people are allowed individual self-exploration. Her work focuses on helping people to create authentic and intimate relationships while emphasizing self-actualization, shame reduction, acceptance, and justice.

Art 
Midori is a multidisciplinary, social practice artist. She creates installations, performances, group exhibitions & social practice projects that examine human narratives, cultural experiences of queerness and Asian American Pacific Islander (AAPI) heritage, and ephemeral nature of memory and place. She has presented lectures at several universities and is a resident artist at the San Francisco Battery.

Midori's work has been shown at San Francisco Asian Art Museum, Yerba Buena Center for the Arts, Leslie Lohman Museum, SOMArts, Ithaca College, Das Arts Amsterdam, Gorilla Gallery Oaxaca, Root Division, among others.

She offers creative coaching and consulting through the Intersection for the Arts, a Bay Area arts nonprofit that’s dedicated to helping artists grow.

Awards 

 Pantheon of Leather Awards Woman of the Year, 2003 
 Sainted by Sisters of Perpetual Indulgence, 2007 
 Best Sex Educator by SF Weekly Magazine, 2013 
 Society of Janus Hall of Fame, 2019 
 AASECT Humanitarian Award, 2022

Bibliography
 The Seductive Art of Japanese Rope Bondage, Greenery Press, 2002 
 Wild Side Sex: The Book of Kink: Educational, Sensual, And Entertaining Essays, Daedalus Publishing, 2005 
 The Toybag Guide to Foot and Shoe Worship, Greenery Press, 2005 
 Master Han's Daughter: Tales from Depraved NeoTokyo Circlet Press, 2006 
 Silk Threads (co-author), Riverdale Avenue Books LLC, 2019 
 An Intersectional Approach to Sex Therapy: Centering the Lives of Indigenous, Racialized, and People of Color (contributing author), Routledge Press, 2022

References

External links
 General info and biography
 Classes and events
 FetishDiva Midori papers, 1990-2014 MC 985. Schlesinger Library, Radcliffe Institute, Harvard University, Cambridge, Mass.

American women writers
BDSM writers
United States Army officers
Sex educators
Bondage riggers
Living people
Women in the United States Army
Japanese erotic artists
American erotic artists
University of California, Berkeley alumni
American performance artists
People from Kyoto
Japanese emigrants to the United States
Writers from the San Francisco Bay Area
American writers of Japanese descent
Women erotica writers
21st-century American women writers
Year of birth missing (living people)